Ptychadena keilingi is a species of frog in the family Ptychadenidae.
It is found in Angola, Democratic Republic of the Congo, and Zambia.
Its natural habitats are moist savanna, subtropical or tropical seasonally wet or flooded lowland grassland, and swamps.

References

Ptychadena
Frogs of Africa
Amphibians of Angola
Amphibians of the Democratic Republic of the Congo
Amphibians of Zambia
Taxa named by Albert Monard
Amphibians described in 1937
Taxonomy articles created by Polbot